Walter O'Keefe (August 18, 1900 – June 26, 1983) was an American songwriter, actor, syndicated columnist, Broadway composer, radio legend, screenwriter, musical arranger and TV host.

Biography
O'Keefe was born in Hartford, Connecticut. He attended the College of the Sacred Heart in Wimbledon, London before entering the University of Notre Dame in South Bend, Indiana in 1916. At Notre Dame, he was a member of the Glee Club and a Class Poet. He graduated cum laude in 1921.

O'Keefe began as a vaudeville performer in the midwest for several years. In 1925, he went to New York City and became a Broadway performer. By 1937, he wrote a syndicated humor column and filled-in for such radio personalities as Walter Winchell, Edgar Bergen, Don McNeill and Garry Moore. He became the long-time master of ceremonies of the NBC show Double or Nothing and was a regular on that network's Monitor series.

O'Keefe also worked in television, presiding over talk shows and quiz shows for the CBS network. Producers Mark Goodson and Bill Todman hired him for their game show Two for the Money. When the show's usual host Herb Shriner had other commitments during the summer of 1954, O'Keefe took over for three months. He was the host for the first Emmy Awards ceremony, held on January 25, 1949 at the Hollywood Athletic Club. He replaced the original host, Rudy Vallée after he left town at the last minute.

O'Keefe wrote the musical scores of several Hollywood films. He introduced the popular song "The Daring Young Man on the Flying Trapeze" in 1934, and it became permanently associated with him.

O'Keefe became addicted to alcohol, and sought treatment in Cleveland, Ohio during the late 1960s.

Death and legacy
He has a star on the Hollywood Walk of Fame in the category of radio. He died in Torrance, California of congestive heart failure at the age of 82.

Filmography
 1929 The Sophomore - actor and music composer
 1929 Red Hot Rhythm - actor, music composer and lyricist
 1930 Dancing Sweeties - music composer
 1930 Sweet Kitty Bellairs - music composer
 1931 The Smart Set-Up - actor
 1935 Vagabond Lady - music composer and lyricist
 1936 Prison Shadows - actor
 1938 Go Chase Yourself - screenwriter
 1941 Too Many Blondes - music arranger
 1952 Two for the Money (TV Series) - guest host
 1954 Screen Snapshots: Hollywood Stars on Parade - himself
 1956 The NBC Comedy Hour (Episode #1.16) - actor (himself)

References

External links
 Prelinger Film Collection - Walter O'Keefe serving as an announcer in a 1940 screen ad, archive.org; accessed October 6, 2017.

1900 births
1983 deaths
American film score composers
Songwriters from Connecticut
American radio personalities
American male radio actors
American male film actors
American game show hosts
Male actors from Hartford, Connecticut
Musicians from Hartford, Connecticut
Songwriters from New York (state)
University of Notre Dame alumni
Vaudeville performers
Writers from Hartford, Connecticut
20th-century American male actors
20th-century American composers
American male film score composers
20th-century American male musicians
American male songwriters